The  or GEH is a German national association for the conservation of historic and endangered domestic animal breeds.

History

The GEH was founded on 5 December 1981 in the Rottal, in Lower Bavaria in southern Germany. It has about 2100 members. Since it was founded, no domestic livestock breed has become extinct in Germany.

Activities

The GEH co-operates with other national and international organisations for the conservation of biodiversity. It publishes an annual Rote Liste or red list of endangered breeds of livestock, which attributes one of four categories of conservation risk to domestic breeds of cattle, dogs, goats, horses, pigs, rabbits and sheep, of chickens, ducks, geese and turkeys, and of bees; listing of domestic pigeon breeds is in preparation. Some breeds from outside Germany are listed separately. The four levels of risk are:

 I: , "extremely endangered"
 II: , "seriously endangered"
 III: , "endangered"
 , "alert"

The risk level is calculated using a formula that takes into account five criteria: the number of breeding animals or breeding females; the percentage of pure-bred matings; the five-year trend in breed numbers; the number of breeders or herds; and the interval between generations of the animal.

The same levels of conservation risk are assigned as in the main red list.

Endangered breed of the year

Since 1984 the GEH has each year named one or more animal breeds as "endangered breed of the year". To date, these have been:

Note

References

Agriculture in Germany
Biodiversity
Conservation and environmental foundations
Sustainable agriculture
Rare breed conservation
Animal welfare organisations based in Germany
1981 establishments in Germany